Following are the results of the 1948 Soviet First League football championship. Lokomotiv Kharkov winning the championship.

Qualifying stage

Central Zone

Russian SFSR Zone 1

Russian SFSR Zone 2

Ukrainian Zone
The zone was expanded from 13 to 16 teams split into two subgroups. The relegated Bolshevik Zaporozhie was replaced with the best three teams of Donbas group (Group 6) and the champion of the 1947 Football Championship of the Ukrainian SSR.

For undetermined reasons (for finishing second in the zone last season?) FC Shakhter Stalino was promoted to the 1949 Pervaya Gruppa without the need to qualify for the league's finals.

Subgroup A

Subgroup B

Final

1st place play-off
Lokomotiv Kharkov - Stal Dnepropetrovsk 3:1

Southern Zone

Central-Asian Zone

Final stage

Number of teams by republics

See also
 1948 Soviet First Group
 1948 Soviet Cup

References

 1948 at rsssf.com

1948
2
Soviet
Soviet